Verkhnyaya Zabolot is a rural locality in Nizhnemedveditsky Selsoviet Rural Settlement, Kursky District, Kursk Oblast, Russia. Population:

Geography 
The village is located in the Bolshaya Kuritsa River basin (a right tributary of the Seym River), 97 km from the Russia–Ukraine border, 27 km north-west of Kursk, 13 km from the selsoviet center – Verkhnyaya Medveditsa.

 Climate
Verkhnyaya Zabolot has a warm-summer humid continental climate (Dfb in the Köppen climate classification).

Transport 
Verkhnyaya Zabolot is located 3 km from the federal route  Crimea Highway (a part of the European route ), 3 km from the road of intermunicipal significance  ("Crimea Highway" – Nizhnyaya Zabolot), 24 km from the nearest railway halt Bukreyevka (railway line Oryol – Kursk).

The rural locality is situated 30.5 km from Kursk Vostochny Airport, 148 km from Belgorod International Airport and 226 km from Voronezh Peter the Great Airport.

References

Notes

Sources

Rural localities in Kursky District, Kursk Oblast